All Saints is an Australian medical drama television series that first screened on the Seven Network on 24 February 1998. Set in the fictional All Saints Western General Hospital, it focused on the staff of Ward 17 until its closure in 2004, which is when the focus changed and began following the staff of the Emergency Department. It was produced by John Holmes alongside Jo Porter, MaryAnne Carroll and Di Drew. The final episode aired on 27 October 2009, completing its record-breaking 12-year run.

Plot 
All Saints follows the lives of the staff at All Saints Western General Hospital. Until its closure in 2004, the show primarily focused on the staff in Ward 17. Known as the "garbage ward" as it took all the overflow from the other wards, Ward 17 was run by compassionate nun, Sister Terri Sullivan (Georgie Parker). Her staff included her nurses Connor Costello (Jeremy Cumpston), Von Ryan (Judith McGrath), Bronwyn Craig (Libby Tanner), Jared Levine (Ben Tari) and Stephanie Markham (Kirrily White) and her ward clerk Jaz Hillerman (Sam Healy). Luke Forlano (Martin Lynes) and Peter Morrison (Andrew McKaige) were doctors who frequently worked with Terri and her staff. Ben Markham (Brian Vriends) was an ambulance officer who worked closely with Luke, despite their rivalry. Bronwyn left Ward 17 and became an ambulance officer at the end of 1998 but returned to the ward full-time at the end of season 3.

Peter and Jaz were written out early on in the second season which introduced Doctor Mitch Stevens (Erik Thomson, an old boyfriend of Terri's with whom she had unfinished business. More of the original cast left: Stephanie was killed in a car accident in Season 3 and Connor left in Season 4. The beginning of the fourth season gave Ben a new ambulance partner, Scott Zinenko (Conrad Coleby), and the concluding episodes introduced two new nurses, Paula Morgan (Jenni Baird) and Nelson Curtis (Paul Tassone). Long-serving doctor Charlotte Beaumont (Tammy Macintosh) made her debut in the fifth season.

Cast

Main cast

Recurring cast

Production 
After the death of Dr. Mitch Stevens (Erik Thomson) and the departure of Bron Craig (Libby Tanner) in 2003, the producers decided to do something in response to considerable drop in ratings and to prolong the life of the series.

In February 2004, John Holmes told The Age journalist Debi Enker that All Saints would be undergoing "major surgery" when the focus shifted from Ward 17 to the Emergency Department. He also stated that while four familiar faces will be leaving, new characters will be introduced to fill the void. Holmes recalled a statement that he made in May 2003 in which he said, "we [myself and Seven script executive Bevan Lee] were seeing the scripts and watching episodes and we were feeling that there was a little bit of a sameness in it. We started to think, 'Don't know about this. Sixth year. Maybe we've had a few too many people through the door of Ward 17 on a trolley and had the 'Hi, I'm Von, I'm your nurse. Room Three, thanks Sterlo.'" After tossing up between cancelling the show and using it as the foundation of a spin-off series, Holmes and Lee decided to rejuvenate the show by changing the setting. Ward 17 would then close and the show would be relocated to the Emergency Department.

As a result of the shift, several cast members decided to leave the show. Paula Morgan (Jenni Baird), Luke Forlano (Martin Lynes), Alex Kearns (Fletcher Humphrys) and Sterling McCormack (Henry Nixon) were all written out of the show. Former Always Greener star John Howard signed a three-year deal and was added to the cast as the cranky head of Emergency, Dr. Frank Campion. Other new faces included Wil Traval as Dr. Jack Quade, Mark Priestley and Natalie Saleeba as nurses Dan Goldman and Jessica Singleton and Alexandra Davies as ambulance officer Cate McMasters.

Season eight saw one of the biggest changes yet as Terri Sullivan (Georgie Parker), who until then had been the main character, was written out halfway through the year, leaving Von Ryan (Judith McGrath) as the last remaining original character and resulting in John Howard being moved into top billing. The last two episodes of the season introduced Chris Vance as doctor Sean Everleigh.

The ninth season would see another large cast turnover. Nelson and Jessica both left, while arriving were Allison Cratchley as doctors Zoe Gallagher, Andrew Supanz as intern Bartholomew West, Virginia Gay as new nurse unit manager Gabrielle Jaeger and Jolene Anderson as nurse Erica Templeton. John Waters appeared for a run of episodes as surgeon Mike Vlasek before returning full-time the following season. Season ten saw Vincent and Cate written out while Sean was killed off: His replacement was Steve Taylor (Jack Campbell), an old boyfriend of Gabrielle.

The eleventh season would see more comings and goings as Zoe departed mid-season. The latter part of the year saw Erica murdered off-screen, while the death of actor Mark Priestley resulted in Dan Goldman making his last appearance in the season's penultimate episode, the same episode where Jack Quade departed. As a result, the final run of episodes introduced Kip Gamblin as doctor Adam Rossi and Ella Scott Lynch as nurse Claire Anderson. Alix Bidstrup, who had appeared for a run of episodes earlier in the year as Amy Fielding, Frank's niece and a newly qualified nurse, returned as a regular.

In 2009 another attempt to stem the softening ratings and add a bit of excitement to the series, Seven Network executives decided to rejuvenate again, introducing a medical response unit to deal with tricky rescues which involved a helicopter going to remote locations to rescue patients who needed assistance. They would then bring those patients back to the ED and the staff there would assist in their treatment. Along with the addition of the new "department" the show was also renamed to All Saints: Medical Response Unit, the introduction of Mirrah Foulkes and the new MRU proved to lift the ratings substantially, but then levelled out at where they were prior to the revamp.

In June 2009, after months of rumours that the cancellation of All Saints was imminent, a spokeswoman from the Seven Network informed The Daily Telegraph that the episode order had been trimmed. Season twelve of All Saints would screen 24 episodes instead of the usual 40 episodes and that production would cease in August instead of November.

In July 2009, exactly one month later after the first announcement, Tim Worner, Seven's Director of Programming at the time announced that All Saints had been cancelled. He told Michael Idato of the Sydney Morning Herald, "All Saints is a show which Seven and viewers have loved. However, an audience shift and increased production costs are behind this tough decision." He also informed Idato that the episode order trim had been reverted and the season would complete a 37 episode order, finishing on episode 493. It was reported after the announcement that since the introduction of the MRU in 2009 it inflated the cost of each episode to $500,000. Many people still argue as to why the MRU was introduced in the first place or should have been removed instead of axing the show if the network was wanting to cut costs.

In the Feb/Mar 2010 GQ magazine in 2010, Tim Worner said his one regret was "Axing All Saints. But it was the right call at the time and we have two new drama projects in development."

Controversy

Episode 265 
On 20 April 2004, episode 265, "Brave New World" aired, which saw the introduction of John Howard's character, Frank Campion. It was also the first episode to be set in the Emergency Department. This episode attracted lots of controversy.

One patient came into the triage and tried to get help, but he was told to wait. Later on, Nelson heard a phone ring coming from the patient and asked him to turn off the phone. It was later hinted that he had been using the phone to masturbate and it had gotten stuck in his rectum.

The end of the episode saw Frank go introduce himself to Terri (Georgie Parker), who was recovering from heart surgery. During a heated argument about staff members, Frank blatantly said to Terri, "if you ever use your influence with your previous employees to white-ant me again, you will never work in Emergency." Before Terri could get a word in, Frank added, "can I make it any fucking clearer?"

The next day, Channel Seven announced that they had received more than 100 phone calls in Melbourne alone. Parker told the media, "it's a good response because it's not about the shock words—we've sworn on the show before—but because people clearly feel really protective about Terri. It's like they really feel for her as a character and don't like her being under attack by a very confronting man. It's great to know they care for her so much."

On 22 April, the network issued a statement that read, "within an M classification code, coarse language is permitted provided it is appropriate to the storyline or program context." An apology was not made.

Episode 432 
On 27 May 2008, episode 432, "Never Tell" aired.

This episode saw a woman pregnant from an incestuous relationship with her brother, told her child may have Down syndrome as a result.

Leading geneticist Dr. David Amor of Murdoch Children's Research Institute stated, "There is absolutely no increase in the risk of Down syndrome for the offspring of incestuous relationships."

Down Syndrome Australia considered legal action, complained to the media regulator, the Australian Communications and Media Authority and called for a boycott by the show's advertisers if an apology and correction was not aired on All Saints the following week.

Seven responded with, "All Saints values its audience and has the greatest respect for their commitment to the program. Without reservation, to any members of the audience who have found an element of a recent story offensive, Channel Seven apologises."

The final episode 
The longer-than-usual 49-minute episode aired at 9:30pm on Tuesday, 27 October 2009. The episode, unlike those in the rest of the season, went back to basics and focused more on the lives of the nurses and doctors as they tended to patients.

The episode saw Judith McGrath's character, Von Ryan tending to a teenage girl who comes into the ED and gives birth without knowing she was pregnant. Tammy Macintosh and John Howard finished their seven- and five-year reigns as Dr. Charlotte Beaumont and Dr. Frank Campion respectively, caring for a woman played by Heather Mitchell who had cystic fibrosis. Ella Scott Lynch and Jonathan Wood left the show on a high with their characters, Claire Anderson and Elliott Parker treating a man (Luke Pegler) with a disease consistent with diabetes and promiscuity.

Secretly, Von decides to resign from All Saints, telling only Frank that she wouldn't be returning. He offers to take her out for dinner, but instead plans a surprise farewell dinner for her. Throughout the dinner, Gabrielle (Virginia Gay) and Steve (Jack Campbell) decide to raise their child together and get back together, Bart (Andrew Supanz) proposes to his girlfriend Amy (Alix Bidstrup) and Charlotte and Adam (Kip Gamblin) share an intense moment.

At the table, Von is pressured to make a speech by her colleagues and friends and reluctantly, she does, uttering her famous line: "I spent a lot of time at All Saints and I'd just like to thank you all for your loyalty, your support and love. Oh bugger this, here's to us." She raises her glass and toasts.

The finale is capped off by a montage of scenes from over the show's twelve-year run, including Mitch's final scene, the closure of Ward 17 and Bron & Ben's wedding, all to The Beatles song, "In My Life".

The final scene sees Frank raise his glass at Von, who raises hers and smiles.

Opening credits 

The first opening theme song for All Saints began with several deep breaths and then went into a tune played by a saxophone. The melody bears a striking similarity to "Fly By Night", the first track on Jethro Tull frontman Ian Anderson's 1983 debut album Walk Into Light. This played over the top of several shots of the cast members. Actors names were in the font Zurich Extra Condensed and underlined. Intercut were shots of hands, various medical equipment and medicine.

The second opening theme song was first used when the opening was upgraded in mid-season two. The same song was used however drums were added to give it more of an authentic sound. The shots of cast changed and names of actors and their characters were now present. The font remained the same. Shots of hands, medical vehicles and equipment were also present.

The first major overhaul of the opening happened in season four, when the titles were completely changed. They now began with several deep breaths over a blue screen with a vision of hands in the background. The screen was set up with a slide of the actor in the centre, with deep blue all around and medical notation. The theme was more stringy and only involved a small saxophone part. Medical crosses, bottles and syringes were present in the opening. This coincided with the change from the standard TV 4:3 aspect ratio to widescreen 16:9.

The second major overhaul of the opening happened in season seven, when the whole layout and font used were completely changed to mark the revamp of the show and its change of focus to the Emergency Department. The basic undertone of the theme was still there, however another saxophone overtone was added tho give the theme more authenticity. The images were also upgraded to include ambulances, surgical equipment and people rushing around in the background. The font changed and actors and characters were now in the font Imprint MT Shadow. This set of opening titles continues until the end of season eight.

At the beginning of season nine, the opening titles credits were ditched and the main cast were listed at the last of every episode with the names returning to their original format and font. This continues until the final episode. In seasons ten and eleven, the actor's name and their corresponding character name flew in from either side, however this idea was dumped when the show returned for its final season.

An intertitle card appeared before every ad break in season nine, however the show returned to fading out in the tenth and eleventh seasons.

At the beginning of the eleventh season, a new title card premiered and this appeared at the start of every episode.

This title card was refurbished for the twelfth and final season to coincide with the change of name. This title card saw the show out.

Reception

Awards and nominations 

The show has been nominated for fifty six Logie awards and won nine.

Australian Film Institute (AFI) Awards
All Saints has won two AFI Awards from the Australian Film Institute and has been nominated for various others.

Ratings

Home media
Seasons 1 to 5 were released by EMI Australia in 2005 through 2007. EMI lost the DVD rights in 2007, therefore seasons 1 to 5 were discontinued.

Universal Sony Pictures Home Entertainment Australia were later awarded DVD rights to the show, releasing seasons 8 to 12 in 2009 and 2010. The two "missing seasons" - seasons 6 and 7 - were released on 2 March 2011.  All 12 seasons are being re-released on DVD in Australia in 2018/2019 by Via Vision Entertainment and Madman Entertainment with the first 3 seasons being released as "All Saints Collection One" and available from September 2018.  With "All Saints Collection Two" to follow in November 2018.

DVD Releases

See also

References

External links
All Saints at the National Film and Sound Archive
All Saints at the Australian Television Information Archive
Official Channel 7 site
 

 
1998 Australian television series debuts
2009 Australian television series endings
Australian drama television series
Australian medical television series
Lesbian-related television shows
Seven Network original programming
Television series by Seven Productions
Television shows set in Sydney
English-language television shows
Films about nurses